Čermná nad Orlicí is a municipality in Rychnov nad Kněžnou District in the Hradec Králové Region of the Czech Republic. It has about 1,100 inhabitants. It lies on both banks of the Tichá Orlice River.

Administrative parts
The municipality is made up of the villages of Číčová, Korunka, Malá Čermná and Velká Čermná.

References

Villages in Rychnov nad Kněžnou District